The Red Angel (French: L'ange rouge) is a 1949 French crime drama film directed by Jacques Daniel-Norman and starring Paul Meurisse, Tilda Thamar and Antonin Berval. The film's sets were designed by the art director Raymond Druart.

Synopsis
A former gangster returns from Argentina with a new girlfriend and opens a nightclub called The Red Angel. Her singing performances make it a success, but trouble arrives when one of his former associates on the run from the law takes shelter in the nightclub.

Cast
 Paul Meurisse as 	Pierre Ravignac
 Tilda Thamar as Rita Tyndar
 Antonin Berval as Antonin Baretta
 Paul Demange as 	Loulou
 Ketty Kerviel as 	Plume
 Alexander D'Arcy as 	Ocelli
 Nana DeHerrera as 	Lola 
 Serge Grave as Roger
 Roland Armontel as 	Le commissaire Martin
 Rivers Cadet as Le gardien-chef
 Albert Dinan as Max
 René Hell as 	Harpin
 Jacques Henley as 	Le directeur de la prison
 Charles Lemontier as 	L'inspecteur Lerouge
 Georges Sauval as 	Le chauffeur

References

Bibliography
 Rège, Philippe. Encyclopedia of French Film Directors, Volume 1. Scarecrow Press, 2009.

External links 
 

1949 films
French crime films
1940s French-language films
1949 crime films
Films directed by Jacques Daniel-Norman
1940s French films